Fernand Augereau (Naintré, 23 November 1882– Combrée, 26 July 1958) was a successful early twentieth century French road racing cyclist. Augereau, who was born in Naintré, participated in the 1903 Tour de France, where he finished third, and won Bordeaux–Paris in 1904. He was professional from 1902 to 1911.

External links 

French male cyclists
1882 births
1958 deaths
Sportspeople from Vienne
Cyclists from Nouvelle-Aquitaine